The  Isla San Pedro Nolasco lizard (Uta nolascensis) is a species of lizard. Its range is in Mexico.

References 

Uta
Reptiles of Mexico
Reptiles described in 1921
Taxa named by John Van Denburgh
Taxa named by Joseph Richard Slevin